Podgradje is a settlement immediately south of Ljutomer in northeastern Slovenia. The area traditionally belonged to the Styria region and is now included in the Mura Statistical Region.

On a hill south of the settlement is a three-storey mansion known as Vard Castle. It was built between 1859 and 1862 on the site of a castle that was first mentioned in written documents dating to 1242. North of the mansion is the local church, dedicated to Saint Anne. It belongs to the Parish of Ljutomer. It was mentioned in documents dating to 1545 and was extensively rebuilt in 1736 and a belfry was added in the 1930s.

References

External links
Podgradje on Geopedia

Populated places in the Municipality of Ljutomer